Michel Vidal (October 1, 1824 - October 20, 1895) was a U.S. Representative from Louisiana.

Born in the city of Carcassonne, Languedoc, France, Vidal completed university-level studies in France before emigrating to the Republic of Texas. Soon after Texas became annexed to the United States, Vidal moved to the French-speaking region of south Louisiana.  He engaged in literary and scientific pursuits and served as associate editor of several American and French newspapers for the French-speaking populations of the U.S. and Canada.  He also served as an editor of the New York Courrier des États-Unis and the New Orleans Picayune (now the Times-Picayune).  At the close of the Civil War he was appointed by General John T. Sheridan a registrar for the city of New Orleans. In 1867, he moved to Opelousas, Louisiana, where he founded and edited the Saint Landry Progress.  He served as delegate to the State constitutional convention of 1867 and 1868 (this convention wrote the "Reconstruction Constitution" which was in turn rescinded after white Democrats again gained control of Louisiana government) after 1876.

Upon readmission of Louisiana to representation in Congress, Vidal was elected, from Louisiana's 4th congressional district (which included Opelousas), as a Republican to the Fortieth United States Congress, (July 18, 1868 – March 3, 1869), and was effectively in office until 1870.
He was appointed a United States commissioner under the convention concluded with Peru in 1868 for the adjustment of claims of citizens of either country.
On his leaving Congress, Vidal was appointed by President Ulysses Grant as United States consul at Tripoli, Libya, where he served from April 5, 1870, to October 12, 1876. He died in Montreal.

References

1824 births
1895 deaths
French emigrants to the United States
19th-century American diplomats
19th-century American newspaper editors
American consuls
Republican Party members of the United States House of Representatives from Louisiana
19th-century American politicians